The 2009–10 Kansas Jayhawks women's basketball team will represent the University of Kansas in the 2009–10 NCAA Division I women's basketball season. The Jayhawks are a member of the Big 12 and will attempt to win the NCAA championship. Kansas returns four starters and eight letter winners to the line-up, including All-American guard-forward Danielle McCray. The Jayhawks will add seven newcomers to the 2009-10 team, led by redshirt freshman Angel Goodrich, who sat out the entire 2008-09 season after suffering a knee injury.

Offseason
 July 15: Kansas basketball players Tyshawn Taylor (men’s team) and Danielle McCray (women’s team) each earned a gold medal this month after winning championships in their respective tournaments. McCray helped lead her team to win the USA Women's World University Games in Belgrade, Serbia. McCray was the second leading scorer on Team USA shooting 56.7 percent.
 July 30: The Women's Basketball Coaches Association (WBCA), on behalf of the Wade Coalition, announced the 2009-2010 preseason "Wade Watch" list for The State Farm Wade Trophy Division I Player of the Year. Kansas player Danielle McCray has been named to the 2009-10 preseason "Wade Watch" list, which is made up of top NCAA Division I student-athletes who best embody the spirit of Lily Margaret Wade. This is based on the following criteria: game and season statistics, leadership, character, effect on their team and overall playing ability.
August 21: The 2009-10 preseason candidates list for the Women’s Wooden Award was released, naming 31 student athletes. Danielle McCray from Kansas was one of the candidates.

Exhibition

Regular season
Nov 18: Senior All-American Danielle McCray was one of 50 players named to the Naismith Trophy Preseason Watch List announced by the Atlanta Tipoff Club.
Nov 22: Senior Sade Morris scored a career-high 26 points. She also became the 21st player in Kansas women's basketball history to join the 1,000-point club.

Roster

Schedule
The Jayhawks, who reached the 2009 WNIT championship game after playing one of the toughest schedules in the country, will also face five non-conference foes who reached postseason play in 2009.
The Jayhawks will compete in the 2009 Junkanoo Jam on Grand Bahama Island Nov. 26-28. Kansas will face Xavier in the opening round on Thanksgiving Day (Thursday, Nov. 26), and will play either Minnesota or TCU Saturday, Nov. 28.
The Sunflower Showdown will resume on January 9.

Big 12 Tournament

Postseason

Women's National Invitation Tournament (WNIT)

Awards and honors

Team players drafted into the WNBA

See also
2009–10 Kansas Jayhawks men's basketball team

References

External links
Official Site

Kansas Jayhawks women's basketball seasons
Kansas
Kansas
Kansas